San Giorgio a Colonica is a village of Prato with 1,500 people.

Culture 

There are a lot of monument in San Giorgio a Colonica:

Roman Castle
Church of Saint George
Colzi's House

References 

Province of Prato